Spring Hill Historic District may refer to:
 Spring Hill Historic District (Mansfield, Connecticut)
 Spring Hill (Ballardsville, Kentucky), on the National Register of Historic Places listings in Oldham County, Kentucky
 Spring Hill Historic District (Sandwich, Massachusetts)
 Spring Hill Historic District (Somerville, Massachusetts)
 Spring Hill (Raleigh, North Carolina)
 Spring Hill (Massillon, Ohio), on the National Register of Historic Places listings in Stark County, Ohio

See also
Spring Hill (disambiguation)